The Tom Hoad Cup was an annual four-day international water polo event, staged in Perth, Western Australia from 2003 to 2012.  The event is named for Tom Hoad, a former coach and long-time player for the Australia national water polo team and senior administrator in the international governing body (FINA).

The event is hosted by the Melville Water Polo Club and the competition is played at Bicton Pool.

Results
 2011.
 Gold : Partizan Belgrade, Serbia
 Silver : Fremantle Mariners, Australia
 Bronze : Barbarians, Australia
 4th Place : Japan
 5th Place : China

 2010.
 Gold : Szeged VE, Hungary
 Silver : Fremantle Mariners, Australia
 Bronze : Guangdong, China
 4th Place : Japan
 5th Place : Barbarians, Australia

 2009.
 Gold : Fremantle Mariners, Australia
 Silver : Barbarians, Australia
 Bronze : Vasas Sport Club, Hungary
 4th Place : China
 5th Place : Japan

 2008.
 Gold : Barbarians, Australia
 Silver : Fremantle Mariners, Australia
 Bronze : Guangdong, China
 4th Place : China
 5th Place : Galatasaray, Turkey
 6th Place : Tsukuby University, Japan

 2007.
 Gold : Australian All Stars
 Silver : Fremantle Mariners, Australia
 Bronze : Partizan Belgrade, Serbia
 4th Place : Romania
 5th Place : China

 2006.
 Gold : Partizan Belgrade, Serbia
 Silver : Fremantle Mariners, Australia
 Bronze : Brescia, Italy
 4th Place : China
 5th Place : South Africa
 6th Place : NCS Universities, Japan
 
 2005.
 Gold : Fremantle Mariners, Australia
 Silver : BVSC, Hungary
 Bronze : Guangdong, China
 4th Place : South Africa
 
 2004.
 Gold : Fremantle Mariners, Australia
 Silver : Rari Nantes Florentia, Italy
 Bronze : Guangdong, China
 4th Place : Croatian Junior National Team

 2003.
 Gold : Rari Nantes Florentia, Italy
 Silver : Fremantle Mariners, Australia
 Bronze : Medvescak, Croatia
 4th Place : Athens Combined Team, Greece

References

External links
 
 

International water polo competitions hosted by Australia
Sport in Perth, Western Australia
Recurring sporting events established in 2003
2012 disestablishments in Australia
2003 establishments in Australia
Recurring sporting events disestablished in 2012